The 2016–17 Ligue 1 season was the 79th season since its establishment. Paris Saint-Germain were the defending champions. The fixtures were announced on 1 June 2016. The season began on 12 August 2016 and ended on 20 May 2017.

On 17 May 2017,  Monaco secured the title after 37 matches, their first since the 1999–2000 season, the first under the Ligue 1 name and their eighth French title in total.

Teams
There were 20 clubs in the league, with three promoted teams from Ligue 2 replacing the three teams that were relegated from Ligue 1 following the 2015–16 season. All clubs that secured Ligue 1 status for the season were subject to approval by the DNCG before becoming eligible to participate.

Stadia and locations

Personnel and kits

Managerial changes

League table

Results

Relegation play-offs
The 2016–17 season saw the return of relegation play-offs between the 18th placed Ligue 1 team, Lorient, and the 3rd placed Ligue 2 team, Troyes, on a two-legged confrontation.

Troyes won 2–1 on aggregate and were promoted to 2017–18 Ligue 1; Lorient were relegated to 2017–18 Ligue 2.

Number of teams by regions

Season statistics

Top goalscorers

Hat-tricks

Note
4 Player scored 4 goals

Clean sheets

Attendances
These are the average attendances of the teams.

References

External links 

Ligue 1 seasons
1
France